Aliana is a 2,300-acre (931 ha) planned community in unincorporated Fort Bend County, Texas. It consists of 13 subdivisions and is within the Greater Houston area. All properties in Aliana have a Richmond, Texas address. The community is completely served by Fort Bend Independent School District and is located along Grand Parkway.

Geography 
Aliana is mostly within the extraterritorial jurisdiction of Houston, and is northwest of Sugar Land and east of Pecan Grove.

The community stretches from State Highway 99 to FM 1464, neighboring the Old Orchard neighborhood and future development of the Harvest Green community.

Culture 
Aliana has two clubhouses, The Club at Aliana and The Westmoor Club. Both locations have a gymnasium, tennis courts, and a pool.

Additionally, Aliana has 7 parks, lakes, and jurisdictional wetlands.

Located around Aliana are multiple outdoor commercial developments, the largest one being in the northwest corner of the community. In April 2016, an H-E-B grocery store opened at the corner of Harlem Road and West Bellfort Street. In May 2021, a Houston Methodist multispecialty facility opened. In November 2021, a 3.7 million sq. ft. Amazon fulfillment center opened across West Bellfort Road.

Aliana has a community council named Kith & Kin that is funded by a 0.25% fee paid for by the selling homeowner each resale.

Government 
Although all properties in Aliana have a Richmond, Texas address, the entire community is outside any city jurisdiction. Fort Bend County MUD's serve the electrical, water, and other municipal needs of the area. 

The Northeast Fort Bend County Volunteer Fire Station #2 provides fire services to the community. 

In addition to regular policing, the Fort Bend County Sheriff's Department operates a patrol around the Aliana area.

Education 
Aliana is within the Fort Bend Independent School District.

The subdivisions of Aliana north of West Airport Boulevard and east of Westmoor Drive are zoned to Carolyn and Vernon Madden Elementary, and all other subdivisions are zoned to Malala Yousafzai Elementary.

The entire community is zoned to Macario Garcia Middle School. Previously, James Bowie Middle School served the part of the neighborhood north of West Airport.

The portions of Aliana south of West Airport are served by Stephen F. Austin High School, and the rest by William B. Travis High School.

References

External links 

 Aliana Community

Unincorporated communities in Fort Bend County, Texas
Geography of Fort Bend County, Texas